The red-black triplefin (Tripterygion tripteronotum) is a species of fish in the family Tripterygiidae, the threefin blennies. It is widespread in the d the Mediterranean Sea and the Black Sea. In the Black Sea it occurs off the coasts of the Crimea and Ukraine.

References

Red-black triplefin
Fish of Europe
Fish of the Black Sea
Fish of the Mediterranean Sea
Fish described in 1810